Casumo is a Maltese online casino and sportsbook services company, which includes video slots, jackpot games, live casino, table games and betting. Casumo has its headquarters in Malta in Swieqi, and has additional offices in Skopje (North Macedonia) and Gibraltar. Casumo also owns online casino operators Dunder and Kazoom Casino.

Background
Casumo is licensed to operate remote gaming business by the Malta Gaming Authority. In 2015, Casumo received its license to operate in the United Kingdom from the UK Gambling Commission. In November 2018, Casumo received its license in Sweden from the Swedish regulator, Spelinspektionen. In March 2018, Casumo agreed a deal with sportsbook supplier Kambi, to deliver a gamified sports betting product to its customers. It also opened its UK Sportsbook market in late 2019. In April 2019, Casumo received a 5-year license to operate in Denmark from the Danish gambling authority.

Operations
In March 2018, Casumo announced a deal with B2B sports service organisation the Kambi Group.

In April 2022, Casumo announced their strategic partnership with iGaming content provider SYNOT Games.

Sponsorships
Casumo had partnered with the eSports team Planet Odd and has also sponsored Wembley Arena where eSports events are held.

On 28 June 2019, Casumo announced a two-year principal sponsorship deal with Reading F.C.

Awards
 2013 eGaming Review (EGR) Awards: Rising Star
 2014 eGaming Review (EGR Awards: Innovation in Casino
 2015 eGaming Review (EGR) Awards: Innovation in Casino
 2015 eGaming Review (EGR) Awards: Mobile Casino Product of the Year
 2016 eGaming Review (EGR) Nordic Awards: In-House Innovation
 2016 eGaming Review (EGR) Nordic Awards: Marketing Campaign
2017 eGaming Review (EGR) Awards: Affiliate Program
 2017 eGaming Review (EGR) Nordic Awards: Mobile Operator
 2018 eGaming Review (EGR) Nordic Awards: Mobile Operator
 2019 International Gaming (IGA) Awards: Online Casino Operator

Regulatory sanctions
On 10 May 2018 the UK Gambling commission imposed a financial penalty under section 121 of the Gambling Act at the sum of £5,850,000 on Casumo Services Limited. The fine was due to a breach of Anti-money laundering measures and failure to comply with the social responsibility code of practice. The licensee has accepted the decision.

On 2 April 2019 Casumo was yet again hit by another regulatory imposed fine by the Dutch gambling regulator Kansspelautoriteit (KSA) for the amount of €310,000 for illegally targeting consumers in the Netherlands.

In March 2021 Casumo was hit yet again by a €7m fine from the Gambling Commission after failing to comply multiple times with key elements within social- and financial concepts revolving around the industry.

In March 2022, the Gambling Commission imposed a financial penalty after the company allowed a customer to lose £1.1m without any interaction. The penalty was imposed under the Social Responsibility code provision 3.4.1., which states that ““licensees must interact with customers in a way which minimises the risk of customers experiencing harms associated with gambling”. As a result of not meeting the requirements for this in addition to anti-money laundering fails, the Gambling commission imposed a £6/$8.2 million fine.

References

Online casinos
Companies established in 2012
Online gambling companies of Malta
2012 establishments in Malta